Camporeale is a surname. Notable people with the surname include:

Enzo Camporeale (born 1966), Italian pianist, composer, and vocalist
Scott Camporeale (born 1975), Australian rules footballer